Tyler James Johnson (born June 7, 1981) is an American former professional baseball pitcher. He played three seasons in Major League Baseball (MLB) for the St. Louis Cardinals.

Professional career
Johnson spent most of the  season with the Cardinals' minor league team, the Triple-A Memphis Redbirds, but appeared in 56 games and pitched  innings with the St. Louis Cardinals. In the 2006 postseason, he pitched  innings and compiled a 1.23 ERA, including one scoreless inning pitched in the 2006 World Series, which the Cardinals won, defeating the Detroit Tigers, four games to one. He pitched again for the Cardinals in  before becoming injured and missing the  season. He was non-tendered following the 2008 season.

On February 5, Johnson signed a minor league contract with an invitation to spring training with the Seattle Mariners. After 2 months in the minors rehabbing, Johnson was released on June 6.

Signed a minor league contract for 2012 season with the Colorado Rockies.

As of 2007, Johnson featured a four-seam fastball at 88–92 mph and a curveball at 78–81.

References

External links
 Baseball Reference

1981 births
Living people
St. Louis Cardinals players
Major League Baseball pitchers
Baseball players from Missouri
Sportspeople from Columbia, Missouri
Johnson City Cardinals players
Moorpark Raiders baseball players
Peoria Chiefs players
Palm Beach Cardinals players
Tennessee Smokies players
Memphis Redbirds players
Springfield Cardinals players
Tacoma Rainiers players
Tulsa Drillers players
Colorado Springs Sky Sox players